CKXR-FM is a Canadian radio station in Salmon Arm, British Columbia. The station is owned by Bell Media and airs an adult hits format under the on-air brand Bounce 91.5.

History
CKXR first signed on the air on November 18, 1965 on its original frequency of 580 AM, under original owners Hall-Gray Broadcasting Company Ltd. Three days later, CKXR put its Revelstoke rebroadcaster CKCR on the air at 1340 AM. CKXR and CKCR became the founding stations of a regional radio system called the Big R Network shortly after the stations' establishment.

On July 21, 1972, CKXR increased its transmission power to 10,000 watts in the daytime and 1000 watts at night. On May 16, 1974, CKCR Revelstoke was upgraded from a rebroadcaster of CKXR to a semi-satellite when CKCR began originating programming from its own studio, in addition to receiving the balance of its programs from CKXR. That same year CKCR set up a rebroadcaster of its own when CKGR in Golden began operations at 1400 AM. On December 31, 1984, CKGR also began originating some programming, and CKIR in Invermere began rebroadcasting CKGR at 870 AM.

In 1999, the CRTC approved the purchase of CKXR and its rebroadcasters by Okanagan Skeena Group Ltd., which was subsequently purchased by Telemedia. With the Telemedia purchase, CKXR received the EZ Rock branding shortly afterward. Telemedia's broadcasting assets (including CKXR) were purchased by Standard Broadcasting (through its Standard Radio division) in 2002. On June 5, 2006, CKXR received approval to move to the FM band at its current frequency; it was originally to simulcast programming with its old 580 AM frequency for three months, but the simulcast period was extended to February 27, 2008, due to the new FM signal not reaching the communities of Enderby and Sicamous, to allow CKXR to set up rebroadcast transmitters in those communities (104.3 FM with 210 watts in Enderby, 102.1 FM with 200 watts in Sicamous).

In October 2007, the assets of Standard Radio (including CKXR) were purchased by Astral Media. Astral's assets were acquired by the station's current owner, Bell Media, in September 2013.

CKCR in Revelstoke applied to convert to FM which received approval on March 3, 2009. CKCR now broadcasts on 106.1 MHz with 800 watts.

On October 15, 2010, CKGR received approval to move from the AM band to the FM band on the frequency of 106.3 MHz.

On May 18, 2021, CKXR, along with all remaining EZ Rock-branded stations, dropped the brand in favor of the new Bounce brand, with a switch to Bounce's adult hits format.

Rebroadcasters

References

External links
 Bounce 91.5
 
 
CKXR-FM history - Canadian Communication Foundation

Kxr
Kxr
Kxr
Radio stations established in 1965
Salmon Arm
1965 establishments in British Columbia